Sir Henry Frederick Ross Catherwood (30 January 1925 – 30 November 2014) was a British politician and writer.

Early life and education
Catherwood was born at Castledawson, County Londonderry, Northern Ireland. He was educated at Shrewsbury School and Clare College, Cambridge.

Career
He was former Director General of the National Economic Development Council, Chief industrial Adviser at the Department of Economic Affairs (1964–66), President of the Evangelical Alliance and President of the International Fellowship of Evangelical Students (IFES) He was knighted in 1971. From 1972 to 1976 he was Chairman of the Institute of Management and Chairman of the British Overseas Trade Board (1975–79).

Catherwood was committed to economic co-operation within the European community for much of his professional life. He was elected as a Conservative member of the European Parliament for Cambridgeshire and related areas from 1979 until his retirement in 1994. He was Vice President of the European Parliament 1989–1992.

Personal life
He married Elizabeth, the daughter of Christian pastor and author Martyn Lloyd-Jones. The Catherwoods had two sons and a daughter. Their son Christopher Catherwood is an author. Their daughter, Bethan Marshall, is a university lecturer, and younger son Jonathan is Director of the Martyn Lloyd Jones Trust.

Sir Fred Catherwood died in Cambridge, England on 30 November 2014 at the age of 89.

Bibliography
Catherwood authored many books and hundreds of articles in a range of journals. He described the requirements of responsible management and good industrial relations. His books include: 
The Christian in Industrial Society, 1964, rev. edn 1980 (On the Job, USA, 1983);
Britain with the Brakes Off, 1966;
The Christian Citizen, 1969;
A Better Way, 1976;
First Things First, 1979;
God's Time God's Money, 1987;
Pro Europe?, 1991;
David: Poet, Warrior, King, 1993;
At the Cutting Edge (memoirs), 1995;
Jobs & Justice, Homes & Hope, 1997;
It Can be Done, 2000;
The Creation of Wealth: Recovering a Christian Understanding of Money, Work, and Ethics, 2002

Obituaries and tributes
 The Guardian obituary written by Stephen Bates. 
 The Times obituary
 Fulcrum tribute, written by Elaine Storkey
 IFESworld tribute, written by Penny Vinden.

References

Who's Who 2009
Crossway

External links 

 The Papers of Sir Frederick Catherwood held at Churchill Archives Centre, Cambridge

1925 births
2014 deaths
People educated at Shrewsbury School
Alumni of Clare College, Cambridge
People from County Londonderry
Conservative Party (UK) MEPs
Knights Bachelor
Accountants from Northern Ireland
MEPs for England 1979–1984
MEPs for England 1984–1989
MEPs for England 1989–1994